Provins is a commune in the Seine-et-Marne department in the Île-de-France region in north-central France. Known for its well-preserved medieval architecture and importance throughout the Middle Ages as an economic center and a host of annual trading fairs, Provins became a UNESCO World Heritage Site in 2001.

Administration
With 11,844 inhabitants (2017), Provins is not the largest town in the arrondissement of Provins, but it is the seat (sous-préfecture). The largest town is Montereau-Fault-Yonne (20,206 inhabitants).

The arrondissement has 176 communes and 188,637 inhabitants (2017). The canton of Provins has 81 communes and 57,947 residents.

History

There are signs of human occupation in the area as early as the paleolithic era.

Roman Era 
Provins was at the crossroads of two major regional corridors in Roman Gaul: one from Soissons to Troyes and one towards Sens in the south.

Medieval Era 
As proof of its growing importance, by the 9th century, Provins was minting its own coin, the “denier provinois,” and Charlemagne had sent his missi dominici to the town. Under the protection of the Counts of Champagne, Provins hosted one of the largest Champagne fairs, an agricultural and trade fair crucial to the medieval economy. In the upper portion of the town, the fair would be held twice a year, in May and November, whereas in the lower town, there was a yearly market in September. During that time, Provins also because a banking center, with the "denier" being widely accepted throughout Europe. The fairs continued from 1120 until 1320.

King Philip IV visited Provins several times in the late 13th century, devastating the town with harsh taxes that ended its period of prosperity and caused residents to flee. The town was besieged numerous times and changed hands frequently in the 14th through 16th centuries. This political and economic instability reduced the importance of the city.

In one of the most famous events in Provins’ history, the recently crowned King Charles VII attended mass at the Collégiale Saint-Quiriace church, along with his royal court and saint Joan of Arc on August 3, 1429.

Modern Era 
Being largely unaffected by the Industrial Revolution, Provins remained a small market town throughout the 19th century. The Germans occupied the town in 1870 during the Franco-Prussian War, and were only barely fought off in 1914 during the First World War.

Population

Sights

Provins is known for its well-preserved, original fortifications from the 12th century, such as the Tour César (the Caesar Tower) and city walls. Many of the residential and commercial buildings within the Upper Town are likewise from the 12th century; these buildings held the residences of merchants, stores and counting houses. Of the four main fair towns in the County of Champagne (Troyes, Lagny-sur-Marne,  and  Bar-sur-Aube), Provins is the only one that has retained much of its medieval character.

The Saint Quiriace Collegiate Church is located here. The Empress Galla Placidia is said to have presented Ancona in Italy with the relics of Judas Cyriacus.  However, the saint's head was situated at Provins, brought from Jerusalem by Henry I of Champagne, who built a church in this town to display it.  It is still at the Saint Quiriace Collegiate Church, although construction work during the 12th century was never completed due to financial difficulties during the reign of Philippe le Bel. A dome was added in the 17th century, and the old families of Provins who lived in the upper town were called "Children of the Dome." After the addition of the dome, however, no further restoration efforts have been made towards the church.
The police station (2010) is a piece of contemporary architecture designed by Parisian architects Philippe Ameller and Jacques Dubois.

Two sets of caves underlie parts of the town. The first type were probably used to store food in the Middle Ages. The second, deeper, type contains Bronze and Iron Age graffiti.

Economy

Provins has important rose cultivation. It produces all sorts of foods from roses, and its main specialties are rose petal jam, Provinois rose honey and rose candy. Provins also used to be a large producer of wine, with the medieval methods of wine-making still being carried out by residents, and some vineyards are still being used to produce.

Education
Public preschools (maternelles): Coudoux, Raymond Louis, Terrier Rouge, Ville Haute and Voulzie.
Public primary schools: Coudoux, Désiré Laurent, Marais, Terrier Rouge, Ville Haute and Voulzie.
Public junior high schools (collèges): Jules Verne, Lelorgne de Savigny, and Marie Curie.
Public senior high schools (lycées): Thibaut de Champagne and Les Pannevelles.
There is a private preschool through high school, Institution Sainte-Croix.

Notable people

Provins is the birthplace of:
 Marie Jules César Savigny (1777–1851), zoologist
 Edmond Nocard (1850-1903), veterinarian and microbiologist
 Maurice Hayot (1862–1945), violinist
 Dominique A (born 1968), songwriter and singer
 David Moncoutié (born 1975), retired road racing cyclist

Provins is the hometown of:
 Christian Jacob (born 1959), farmer and politician

Twin towns

Provins is twinned with:
 Bendorf, Germany
 Pingyao, China

See also
 Communes of the Seine-et-Marne department

References

External links

 City council website  
 Champagne and Brie in Medieval History of Navarre
 provins.net 
 provins.org 
 provins-medieval.com  
 Provins photos  
 1999 Land Use, from IAURIF (Institute for Urban Planning and Development of the Paris-Île-de-France région) 
 Ameller Dubois and Associates, architects of the Provins police station  
 

Communes of Seine-et-Marne
World Heritage Sites in France
Subprefectures in France
Champagne (province)